Jason Swepson is an American football coach and former player. He is the head football coach at Lawrence Academy in Groton, Massachusetts, a position he had held since 2018. Swepson served as head football coach at Elon University from 2011 to 2013, compiling a record of 10–24. Previously, he was the running backs coach under Tom  O'Brien at North Carolina State University and Boston College. Swepson played running back at Boston College from 1989 to 1992.

Swepson participated in the Bill Walsh NFL Minority Coaching Fellowship program with the New York Giants (2016), Cleveland Browns (2015), Seattle Seahawks (2014), Miami Dolphins (2000), San Diego Chargers (1999), and Jacksonville Jaguars (1998). He was fired as the head coach at Elon in November 2013.

Head coaching record

College

References

Year of birth missing (living people)
Living people
American football running backs
Bates Bobcats football coaches
Boston College Eagles football coaches
Boston College Eagles football players
Boston University Terriers football coaches
Elon Phoenix football coaches
Holy Cross Crusaders football coaches
MIT Engineers football coaches
NC State Wolfpack football coaches
New Haven Chargers football coaches
Northeastern Huskies football coaches
Rhode Island Rams football coaches
High school football coaches in Massachusetts